The 1979 Swedish motorcycle Grand Prix was the ninth round of the 1979 Grand Prix motorcycle racing season. It took place on the weekend of 20–22 July 1979 at the Karlskoga Motorstadion in Karlskoga, Sweden.

Classification

500 cc

References

Swedish motorcycle Grand Prix
Swedish
Motorcycle Grand Prix